The Men's 50 km Race Walking event at the 2007 Pan American Games took place on July 28, 2007 in the Parque do Flamengo in Rio de Janeiro. Ecuador's Xavier Moreno captured the title, defeating the two Mexicans Horacio Nava and Omar Zepeda.

Medalists

Records

Results

See also
2007 World Championships in Athletics – Men's 50 kilometres walk
Athletics at the 2008 Summer Olympics – Men's 50 kilometre walk

References
Official results

Walk, Men's 50
2007